Team Fortress Classic is a first-person shooter game developed by Valve and published by Sierra Studios. It was originally released in April 1999 for Windows, and is based on Team Fortress, a mod for the 1996 game Quake. The game pits two teams against each other in online multiplayer matches; each member plays as one of nine classes, each with different skills. The scenarios include capture the flag, territorial control, and escorting a "VIP" player.

Valve hired the developers of the Team Fortress mod to develop Team Fortress Classic using its GoldSrc engine (used in their 1998 game Half-Life) to promote the Half-Life software development kit. In 2007, Valve released a sequel, Team Fortress 2, which completely overhauled the tone and artstyle while still preserving much of the core class-based gameplay.

Gameplay

Matches in Team Fortress Classic feature two teams, one red and one blue, and nine playable character classes. Each character class has a set of weapons and abilities unique to that specific class. This differentiation between classes makes for rock-paper-scissors-esque gameplay that requires teammates to work together in order to effectively achieve the objective. The class-system also encourages players to vary their selection of classes and utilize certain classes in conjunction with one another to gain the advantage.

In Team Fortress Classic, a server can hold up to 32 players simultaneously, and matches can be played in a number of game modes, each featuring different objectives.

Classes
In Team Fortress Classic, the player can choose to play as one of nine classes: the Scout, Sniper, Soldier, Demoman, Medic, Heavy Weapons Guy, Pyro, Spy, or Engineer. Each class comes equipped with at least one weapon unique to that class, and often a secondary weapon which may be common across multiple classes (typically a shotgun or nailgun). Additionally, each class gets a melee weapon (all classes, with the exception of the Medic, Spy, and Engineer, wield a crowbar, a homage to Valve's game Half-Life). Finally, each player carries grenades; the effects of grenades vary, depending on the player's class.

In Escort game modes, a player may also choose to play as the Civilian class, which is armed only with an umbrella, no armor, and very little health. Civilians are typically escorted and protected by the rest of the team.

 The Scout is the fastest class in the game, but is unable to deal much damage in return. The Scout is armed with a nailgun as well as being able to use caltrops and concussion grenades to slow down and confuse opponents. He can also disarm the Demoman's detonation pack as well as reveal enemy Spies by running close by fellow players.
 The Sniper class is armed with a high-powered sniper rifle, and can be used to attack enemies from distant positions. 
 The Soldier class is significantly slower than Snipers and Scouts, but possesses better armor and is armed with a rocket launcher that allows him to rocket jump, along with combat shotguns as sidearms for backup. Rocket jumping, while effective for moving about the battlefield, also significantly damages the soldier. Soldiers can also make use of nail bombs to cause more damage within close quarters. 
 The Demoman class is armed with a grenade launcher for indirect fire onto enemy positions, and a Pipe Bomb launcher for booby-trapping places as well as being equipped with a demolition pack capable of opening or closing certain routes on some levels.

 The Medic class is equipped with a super nail gun, concussion grenades and a medical kit that can be used either to heal teammates or expose opponents to a contagious infection that drains health. 
 The Heavy Weapons class is armed with a powerful minigun, and can sustain more damage than any other class. However, the Heavy is significantly slower than the other classes.
 The Pyro class is equipped with a flamethrower and an incendiary rocket launcher, both of which can set enemies on fire. Pyros also carry several napalm grenades for the same purpose. 
 The Spy class differs significantly in style from other classes, as he can disguise himself to look like any other class on either side. The Spy is equipped with a knife to kill enemy players in one hit by stabbing them in the back, a tranquilizer gun to slow down opponents and a hallucination grenade which spouts gas to confuse them. Spies also possess the ability to feign death, allowing them to use their backstab ability more effectively.
 The Engineer class builds structures to support their team, such as sentry guns to defend key points, ammunition dispensers and teleporters. Engineers have the ability to replenish a teammates armor by tapping them with their wrench. In addition, the Engineer is armed with EMP grenades that detonates any explosive ammunition within its range, as well as a shotgun for backup.

Development

Team Fortress was originally a modification for Quake (1996), and then later for QuakeWorld, developed by TF Software Pty. Ltd. Its developers were working on a standalone version, Team Fortress 2, when they were hired by Valve to write a port of Team Fortress as a mod for Valve's game Half-Life. After several delays from the original release date of March 26, 1999, the mod was released on April 7, 1999.

On June 9, 2000, Team Fortress version 1.5 was released a part of Half-Life 1.1 update. It was the first standalone version of Team Fortress. The update added "new sounds and weapons, enhanced graphics, new models for classes and weapons, new maps from popular mapmakers, an updated user interface that makes finding and joining games easy and intuitive, and a new in-game Command Menu Interface". It also included a new in-game interface and the networking code for Valve's then upcoming Team Fortress 2. There were three new maps with the update: Dustbowl, Warpath, and Epicenter. Additionally, the new Command Menu Interface was an in-game menu that allowed players to execute commands to change teams, call for a medic and change classes while in a match.

Valve significantly updated the game over time, tweaking the game's networking code, and adding new maps and game modes. In 2003, Team Fortress Classic was released on Valve's Steam system. Versions for OS X and Linux were released in 2013.

Reception 

Team Fortress Classic received positive reviews, garnering a rating of 85% on the video game review aggregator site GameRankings. There were some criticisms, however, like Graham Smith of Rock, Paper, Shotgun who criticized the game for being "like Counter Strike only messy and gruff" PC Gamer US named Team Fortress Classic the best multiplayer game of 1999, and wrote that it was "more fun and more addictive than any other multiplayer-only title released in 1999, and didn't cost owners of Half-Life a single penny." PC Gamer UK praised the game for its multiple character classes, "sophisticated game-tactics", and drive to work together with your team, but also noted the game's "clunky" inter-team communication and mediocre graphics. In 2010, the game was included as one of the games in the book 1001 Video Games You Must Play Before You Die.

Legacy 
Following the success of Team Fortress as a Quake modification, Team Fortress Software began development of a sequel. Interested in the project's potential, Valve hired the team to develop Team Fortress 2 on the modified Quake engine used by Half-Life. The partnership was announced in 1998, developed in parallel to Team Fortress Classic. However, the game was not shown publicly until a year later at E3 1999. Introduced as Team Fortress 2: Brotherhood of Arms, the game showcased multiple unprecedented technologies for its time and won several awards including "Best Online Game" and "Best Action Game". In June 2000, Valve announced that Team Fortress 2 had been delayed further, attributing this to their rebuilding of the game on a new, proprietary in-house engine that is today known as the Source engine.

Following this delay, little mention of the game was made by Valve for a period of six years. Running up to Half-Life 2'''s release in 2004, Valve's Doug Lombardi claimed that Team Fortress 2 was still being developed and news of its release would come after that of Half-Life 2. However, Lombardi's claim would not come to fruition until Electronic Arts' 2006 Summer Showcase. For the first time in more than half a decade, the game was shown publicly with an art style that notably contrasted its revisions prior. In 2007, Team Fortress 2 was released to critical acclaim as part of The Orange Box.

The plot and characters of Team Fortress 2 were expanded upon outside of the game in the form of short videos or comics. In April 2014, the Team Fortress comic series reintroduced the Team Fortress Classic classes (excluding their respective Medic) as a rival cast of characters to the Team Fortress 2 team. A catch-up comic released on the TF2 website released for free comic book day described Team Fortress Classic as being set in an alternate 1930, and that the game takes place during the Gravel Wars era of the timeline, along with the fact that the Classic engineer is the father of the engineer in Team Fortress 2.

A fan-made total conversion mod for Half-Life 2 titled Fortress Forever was created, aiming to replicate the gameplay of Team Fortress Classic while using the more modern Source engine. Fans have also made a similar mod of Team Fortress 2 titled Team Fortress 2 Classic'', which seeks to marry gameplay elements and concepts from both entries alongside scrapped ideas from the sequel's development cycle and several entirely original additions.

References

1999 video games
Esports games
First-person shooters
Multiplayer online games
Multiplayer video games
Video game remakes
MacOS games
Linux games
Valve Corporation games
Video games developed in the United States
GoldSrc games
GoldSrc mods
Video games set in the 1930s
Hero shooters